Ángel Leonardo Rodríguez Güelmo (born December 2, 1992) is a Uruguayan footballer who plays as a defensive midfielder for CA Fénix.

Career
Rodríguez began his career in 2013 with River Plate Montevideo, where he played for three seasons, until now.

Personal life
He is the twin brother of athlete and fashion model Déborah Rodríguez and son of manager Elio Rodríguez.

References

1992 births
Living people
Footballers from Montevideo
Uruguayan footballers
Association football midfielders
Defensor Sporting players
Club Atlético River Plate (Montevideo) players
Peñarol players
Unión La Calera footballers
Club Bolívar players
Centro Atlético Fénix players
Chilean Primera División players
Uruguayan Primera División players
Bolivian Primera División players
Uruguayan expatriate footballers
Uruguayan expatriate sportspeople in Chile
Uruguayan expatriate sportspeople in Bolivia
Expatriate footballers in Chile
Expatriate footballers in Bolivia